The 1994 Malta Grand Prix was the first edition of the professional invitational snooker tournament, which took place from 28 November to 4 December 1994. The tournament was played at the Jerma Palace Hotel in Valletta, Malta.

John Parrott won the title, defeating Tony Drago 7–6 in the final.

Main draw

References

Malta Grand Prix
Malta Grand Prix
Grand Prix
Malta Grand Prix
Malta Grand Prix
Sport in Valletta
20th century in Valletta